Hércules Morini (born 17 May 1910, date of death unknown) was an Argentine sailor. He competed in the 6 Metre event at the 1952 Summer Olympics.

References

External links
 

1910 births
Year of death missing
Argentine male sailors (sport)
Olympic sailors of Argentina
Sailors at the 1952 Summer Olympics – 6 Metre
Place of birth missing